The 1975 Virginia Senate elections were held on November 4, 1975, alongside the Virginia House of Delegates election. All 40 seats in the Senate of Virginia were up for election.

Overall results

See also 
 Virginia elections
 Virginia House of Delegates election, 1975

References

Virginia
1975 Virginia elections
Virginia Senate elections